Abdelrahman al-Dajani was mayor of Jerusalem from 1863 till 1882.

External links
 http://jerusalem-magazine.blogspot.de/2008/11/jerusalems-new-mayor.html
 http://www.alquds-online.org/index.php?s=15&ss=14&id=437

Arabs in Ottoman Palestine
Year of birth missing
Year of death missing
Palestinian politicians
Mayors of Jerusalem
19th-century people from the Ottoman Empire
19th-century politicians